John Cunnison "Ian" Catford (26 March 1917 – 6 October 2009) was a Scottish linguist and phonetician of worldwide renown.

Biography 
Catford was born in Edinburgh, Scotland. After his secondary and university studies, he studied phonetics. He taught English abroad (in Greece, in Palestine and in Egypt), including during World War II. 

He met his wife, Lotte, while he was living in Jerusalem. Lotte was from Vienna and spoke German. However, she had moved to Palestine and while she was young she learned other languages, such as Hebrew, English and Arabic. This was one source of Catford's knowledge about languages and their phonetics.

Catford founded the School of Applied Linguistics at the University of Edinburgh, as well as another department in the same university that undertook the mapping of different English dialects throughout Scotland. Catford could identify where people were from exclusively through their speech.

His expertise – which included formal phonetics, the aerodynamic and physiological production of speech, phonetic peculiarities in speech, and an astounding ability to reproduce words, and even speeches, backwards – led him to be invited to the University of Michigan. There, he headed the English Language Institute and the Laboratory of Communicative Sciences (current the Laboratory of Phonetics). He taught most of the Linguistics subjects in the same university.

He retired in 1985, but did not become inactive. On the contrary: he was invited to some of the most prestigious universities around the globe, including those in Istanbul, Jerusalem and California. He published numerous articles, participated in many conferences and continued to lecture and give presentations, especially at the University of Michigan. Many of his original works are kept there. He advised many university students who wanted to follow a career in Linguistics.

Catford had two children from his marriage with Lotte: Lorna and Julian. He died, of old age, in October 2009 in Shoreline, Washington, USA.

Works 

Among his many articles, published essays and other works, it is worth highlighting the following: 

A Practical Introduction to Phonetics, 2nd. ed., Oxford University Press, 2002. 
Fundamental Problems in Phonetics
Word-stress and sentence-stress: a practical and theoretical guide for teachers of Basic English
A Linguistic Theory of Translation
Ergativity in Caucasian Languages

References 
Library Thing: Books by J. C. Catford
Memorial Websites: Remembering J. C. Catford
The Catford Tapes: Ian Catford's Life in Linguistics. 67/68 year old Ian relates his life. Videos from 8 “lectures” given between Feb. 7 and Apr. 18, 1985. Altogether 6h 21m of storytelling.

Further reading
 

2009 deaths
1917 births
Phoneticians
University of Michigan staff
British emigrants to the United States
British expatriates in Greece
British expatriates in Mandatory Palestine
British expatriates in Egypt